Sicily is a region of Italy comprising the island of the same name.

Sicily or Sicilia may also refer to:

History
 Sicilia (Roman province)
 Sicily (theme), the Byzantine province
 The Emirate of Sicily, a 10th-century Islamic state
 The Kingdom of Sicily, a medieval and early modern Italian kingdom
 One of its successor states, the 19th-century Kingdom of the Two Sicilies

Places
 Sicily Bridge, a proposed bridge across the Strait of Messina
 Sicily, Illinois
 Sicily Island, Louisiana
 Sicily Township, Gage County, Nebraska

Sicilia
 Sicilia!, a film directed by Jean-Marie Straub and Danièle Huillet 
 
 , a German steamship
 Vega Sicilia, a Spanish winery in the Ribera del Duero

Other uses
 Sicily Sewell, an American actress
 "Sicily", a poem written by John Petrozzi and later a song by The Wiggles from their Sailing Around the World album

See also
 Sicilì, an Italian village in Campania
 Sicilian (disambiguation)
 Cicely (disambiguation)